Innocent, also known as Helix, is a 2009 American action drama film directed by Aram Rappaport, filmed in downtown Chicago, Illinois in one continuous take. There are no cuts in the filming.  Innocent is one of the first ever feature-length films to be shot in one take, and it is a kidnapping thriller that circumnavigates downtown Chicago on foot and by car.

Premise
In Chicago, five peoples' lives intersect in a real-time story.

Cast
 Alexa Vega - Ashley
 Austin O'Brien - Jae
 Carlo Lorenzo Garcia - Johnny
 Nick Eversman - Shane
 Circus-Szalewski - Bum
 Brook Toland - Punky
 Lathan Toland - Teen 
 David Hernandez - Ray Martinez
 Samantha Long - Kristi

Production
Shooting took place in downtown Chicago around Lake Michigan.

References

External links
  Innocent (2010)

2009 films
American thriller films
2009 action thriller films
2000s English-language films
2000s American films
2009 directorial debut films